Screwed Up Movement is the seventh studio album by American rapper E.S.G. from Houston, Texas. It was released as a double album on May 16, 2006 via Sure Shot Recordings. Its disc 2 is a 'Slowed & Throwed' version of its disc 1 edited by DJ Dolby D. The album features guest appearances from Big T, Bun B, Chamillionaire, Fred T and Jae Millz.

Track listing

References

2006 albums
E.S.G. (rapper) albums
Gangsta rap albums by American artists